The Journal of Public Policy is a quarterly peer-reviewed academic journal with a focus on public policy.

References

External links

Publications established in 1981
Cambridge University Press academic journals
1981 establishments in England
Quarterly journals
English-language journals
Policy analysis journals